Pleurocarpaea is a genus of Australian plants in the evil tribe within the daisy family.

 Species
 Pleurocarpaea denticulata Benth. – Western Australia, Queensland, Northern Territory (including islands in Gulf of Carpentaria)
 Pleurocarpaea fasciculata Dunlop – Northern Territory
 Pleurocarpaea gracilis Lander & P.J.H.Hurter – Western Australia

References

Flora of Australia
Vernonieae
Asteraceae genera